Donald Duck: Goin' Quackers (known as Donald Duck: Quack Attack in Europe) is a platform video game developed and published by Ubi Soft for various consoles and Windows-based personal computers. A different game with the same title was first released for the Game Boy Color, as well as on Game Boy Advance, the latter being given the title Donald Duck Advance.

The game's reception was mixed, with reviewers praising the music, backgrounds and animations, but criticizing the short length and its aim to be played by a younger demographic.

Gameplay
Goin' Quackerss gameplay is very similar to that of Crash Bandicoot, and requires the player to move through various settings in 24 levels in four warp rooms. The four level themes are Duckie Mountain, Duckburg, Magica DeSpell's Manor, and Merlock's Temple. Donald Duck has to dodge various enemies and obstacles throughout the levels and defeat bosses at the end of each warp room. There are also bonus levels where Donald Duck has to outrun a bear, a truck with an evil face, a ghost hand, and a statue head, respectively. The viewpoint of the levels can change between a 2D side-scrolling perspective and a 3D perspective. Re-doing the levels in order to defeat Gladstone's time in same, gives the player advantages in the game.

The player has four lives that can increase by finding special items. Each life gives Donald two opportunities to be touched by the enemy; the first time is touched, he becomes angry and throws berserk to the enemies, the second time, he loses a life. Donald can also unlock new outfits, which alter cutscenes and idle animations (such as Donald taking photos of the place if he is dressed like a tourist).

Plot
Goin' Quackers begins with Donald Duck, Gladstone Gander, and Gyro Gearloose watching television reporter Daisy Duck discovering the mysterious temple of the evil magician Merlock. As she tells the story, she is kidnapped by Merlock. His arch-rival Gladstone sets out to find her before Donald, who decides to use Gyro's new invention, the "Tubal Teleport System", to track down Merlock and Daisy. However, the machine does not have enough power to get there and for it to reach Merlock's lair, Donald must go on a journey to plant an antenna at certain locations in order to boost the machine's power. Along the way, he must compete with Gladstone, reverse the spells that Merlock put on Huey, Dewey, and Louie's toys, and defeat several bosses, including the Beagle Boys and Magica De Spell. In the end, Donald is able to locate Merlock; he defeats him and rescues Daisy. The temple collapses, but Gyro is able to teleport them back to his lab, where Donald receives a kiss from Daisy for saving her.

This game features the returning voice talents of Tony Anselmo, Tress MacNeille, June Foray and Russi Taylor.

Development

The game was conceptualized by Ubi Soft Montreal in a collaboration with Disney Interactive as an homage to Disney comic book artist Carl Barks, who died in 2000. The Nintendo 64, Dreamcast, PC and PS1 versions of the game are built on an optimized Rayman 2 engine. The score for Goin' Quackers was composed by Shawn K. Clement. The Nintendo 64 version is completely original from the PS2 version, those consoles being too different; the N64 and Dreamcast versions were developed in Casablanca (Morocco), making it the first console video game made on the African continent. The Game Boy Color version was developed by Ubi Soft Milano.

Donald Duck Advance

Donald Duck Advance is a re-release of the original game for Game Boy Advance. This version was developed by Ubi Soft Shanghai, who were responsible for developing the PS1 version. It was released in 2001 (December 15 in North America and November 16 in the PAL region).

Donald Duck Advance ditches the original 3D segments for a complete 2D approach to the game, not unlike Ubisoft's original Rayman game.

Reception

Goin' Quackers has received mixed to positive reviews. Jon Thompson of Allgame reviewed the PlayStation 2 version and commented that although "it's an easy, competent game, it won't bother you while you're playing it because everything is so darned fun".

Gerald Villoria of GameSpot praised the Nintendo GameCube version's music, saying it was of solid quality with "uplifting" and "upbeat" melodies, but he criticized the game's short length.

IGN's Craig Harris lauded the Game Boy Color version's graphics, citing "stunning" character motions and "beautiful" backgrounds, although he also was dissatisfied with the length of the game.

Villoria also reviewed the Dreamcast version; he felt the CG sequences were "great", and that the character animations were "fluid" and "seamless". He also commented that the level designs were much more interesting than in the PlayStation and Nintendo 64 versions. Although Villoria thought the Dreamcast and PlayStation versions were very similar, he felt the Dreamcast version suffered in terms of gameplay since it did not feature special moves.

Cory D. Lewis of IGN reviewed the Nintendo 64 version, commenting that the game is better suited for younger players and will bore older gamers. He also stated that despite the Nintendo 64 version reusing the optimized Rayman 2 engine, the visuals in Goin' Quackers could not compare to the same level of quality the engine provided a year ago. Moreover, he praised the "bright-colored" cartoon objects and animations.

The PlayStation version was reviewed by Adam Cleveland on IGN, who found the game to be "a lot of fun". He commented that the bosses were creative and fun, but that they were extremely simple and provided little challenge. He summed up the review by stating "Although it may be on the quick and easy side, it's got all the right stuff".

See also
List of Disney video games

References

External links
 
 
 
 

2000 video games
3D platform games
Action-adventure games
Donald Duck video games
Dreamcast games
Game Boy Color games
GameCube games
Nintendo 64 games
PlayStation (console) games
PlayStation 2 games
Single-player video games
Ubisoft games
Video games based on DuckTales
Video games developed in Canada
Video games developed in Italy
Video games developed in China
Video games developed in Morocco
Video games with alternate endings
Video games with alternative versions
Video games with 2.5D graphics
Windows games